North 24 Parganas (abv. 24 PGS (N)) or sometimes North Twenty Four Parganas is a district in southern West Bengal, of eastern India. North 24 Parganas extends in the tropical zone from latitude 22° 11′ 6″ north to 23° 15′ 2″ north and from longitude 88º20' east to 89º5' east.  Barasat is the district headquarters of North 24 Parganas. North 24 Parganas is West Bengal's most populous district and also (since 2014) the most populated district in the whole of India. It is the tenth-largest district in the State by area.

History

British Raj
The territory of Greater 24 Parganas were under the Satgaon (ancient Saptagram, now in Hoogly district) administration during the Mughal era and later it was included in Hoogly chakla (district under post-Mughal Nawabi rule) during the rule of Murshid Quli Khan. In 1757, after the Battle of Plassey, Nawab Mir Jafar conferred the Zamindari of 24 parganas and janglimahals (small administrative units) upon the British East India Company. These Parganas are: 1. Akbarpur, 2. Amirpur, 3. Asimabad, 4. Balia, 5. Baridhati, 6. Basandhari, 7. Calcutta, 8. Dakshin Sagar, 9. Garh, 10. Hathiagarh, 11. Ikhtiarpur, 12. Kharijuri, 13. Khaspur, 14. Maidanmal or Mednimall, 15. Magura, 16. Mayda, 17. Manpur, 18. Murnagacha, 19. Paika, 20. Pechakul, 21. Satal, 22. Shahnagar, 23. Shahpur, and 24. Uttar Pargana (O'Mally, L.S.S. (1914) Bengal District Gazetteers: 24 Parganas. Page 44). Since then, this entire territory is known as 'Twentyfour Parganas'.

In 1751, the Company assigned John Zephaniah Holwell as zemindar of the District. In 1759, after the Bengali War of 1756–1757, the Company assigned it to Lord Clive as a personal Jaghir (zamindari) and after his death it again came under the direct authority of the company.

In 1793, during the rule of Lord Cornwallis, entire Sunderbans were in Twentyfour Parganas. In 1802, some parganas on the western banks of river Hoogly were included into it. These parganas were in Nadia earlier. In 1814, a separate collectorate was established in Twenty-four Parganas. In 1817, Falta and Baranagar and in 1820, some portions of Nadia's Balanda and Anwarpur were encompassed to it. In 1824, portions of Barasat, Khulna and Bakhargunge (now in Bangladesh) were also included to it. In 1824, the district headquarters was shifted from Kolkata to Baruipur, but in 1828, it was removed to Alipore. In 1834, the district was split into two districts – Alipore and Barasat, but later these were united again.

In 1905, some portion of this district around the Sunderbans was detached and linked to Khulna and Barishal. These parts remained in Bangladesh territories where Jessore's Bangaon was joined to Twentyfour Pargana after the 1947 partition.

After Independence
In 1980, an administrative reform committee under the chairmanship of Dr. Ashok Mitra suggested splitting the district into two and as per the recommendation of the committee in 1983, on 1 March 1986, two new districts – North 24 Parganas (24 PGS (N)) and South 24 Parganas (24 PGS (S)) were created.
The North 24 Parganas which was included in the Presidency division has been formed with five sub-divisions of the Greater 24 Parganas, namely Barasat Sadar (Headquarters), Barrackpore, Basirhat, Bangaon, and Bidhannagar (a satellite township of Kolkata, popularly known as Salt Lake).

On 1 August 2022, the Chief Minister of West Bengal Mamata Banerjee announced to create two more districts named Ichamati district consisting of Bangaon subdivision and a yet unnamed district consisting of Basirhat subdivision by bifurcating the district for better development and smooth administration purpose.

Geography
The district lies within the Ganga–Brahmaputra delta. The major distributary of river Ganga that is river Hooghly flows along the western border of the district. There are many other distributory branches, sub-branches of Ganga river and other local rivers, which include the Ichhamati, Jamuna, and Bidyadhari.

Economy

People are mainly engaged in farming, fishing and other agricultural activities. The average size of agricultural landholdings is about 3.2 Bighas. North 24 Parganas is one of the less economically backward districts of West Bengal, but there is chronic poverty in the southern half of the District (the Sundarbans area)

The information technology hub of Kolkata is at this district, which is the centre of some of the notable IT/ITES Indian and multinational companies. Approximately 1,500 companies have their offices in Sector V. Majority of the corporate offices are situated in Sector V and Sector III. Around 3.5 Lakh (by 2017) people are employed in Salt Lake City.

Divisions

Administrative subdivisions
The district comprises five subdivisions: Barrackpore, Barasat Sadar, Basirhat, Bangaon and Bidhannagar.

 Barrackpore Subdivision consists of 16 municipalities (Kanchrapara, Halisahar, Naihati, Bhatpara, Garulia, Barrackpore, North Barrackpur, New Barrackpur, Titagarh, Khardaha, Panihati, Kamarhati, Baranagar, Dum Dum, North Dumdum and South Dumdum (25 Wards)) and 2 community development blocks: Barrackpore I and Barrackpore II.
 Barasat Sadar Subdivision consists of five municipalities (Barasat, Habra, Ashoknagar Kalyangarh, Madhyamgram, and Gobardanga) and 7 community development blocks: Barasat I, Barasat II, Amdanga, Deganga, Habra I, Habra II and Rajarhat (now shifted to Bidhannagar Subdivision).
Bongaon Subdivision, consists of Bangaon municipality and three community development blocks: Bagdah, Bangaon and Gaighata.
 Basirhat Subdivision consists of three municipalities (Basirhat, Baduria and Taki) and ten community development blocks: Baduria, Basirhat I, Basirhat II, Haroa, Hasnabad, Hingalganj, Minakhan, Sandeshkhali I, Sandeshkhali II, Swarupnagar.
Bidhannagar Subdivision consists of Bidhannagar Municipal Corporation,South Dum Dum Municipality (10 wards) and one community development blocks Rajarhat.

Barasat is the district headquarters. There are 35 police stations, 22 development blocks, 27 municipalities, 200 gram panchayats and 1599 villages in this district.

Other than municipality area, each subdivision contains community development blocks which in turn are divided into rural areas and census towns. In total there are 48 urban units: 27 municipalities and 20 census towns and 1 cantonment board.

Barrackpore subdivision
 16 municipalities: Kanchrapara, Halisahar, Naihati, Bhatpara, Garulia, Barrackpore, North Barrackpur, New Barrackpur, Titagarh, Khardaha, Panihati, Kamarhati, Baranagar, Dum Dum, North Dumdum and South Dumdum.
 One Cantonment Board: Barrackpur Cantonment.
 One more census town: Ichhapur Defence Estate.
 Barrackpore I (Community development block) consists of rural areas with 8 gram panchayats and three census towns: Jetia, Garshyamnagar and Kaugachhi.
 Barrackpore II (Community development block) consists of rural areas with 6 gram panchayats and six census towns: Jafarpur, Talbandha, Muragachha, Patulia, Ruiya and Chandpur.
 Panchayet: Duttapukur

Barasat Sadar subdivision
5 municipalities: Barasat, Habra, Ashoknagar Kalyangarh, Madhyamgram and Gobardanga.
 Barasat I (Community development block) consists of rural areas with 9  gram panchayats and 1 census town: Duttapukur.
 Barasat II (Community development block) consists of rural areas only with 7  gram panchayats.
 Amdanga (Community development block) consists of rural areas only with 8  gram panchayats.
 Deganga (Community development block) consists of rural areas only with 13  gram panchayats.
 Habra I (Community development block) consists of rural areas with 7  gram panchayats and 3 census towns: Nokpul, Maslandapur and Sadpur.
 Habra II (Community development block) consists of rural areas with 8  gram panchayats and 2 census towns: Bara Bamonia and Guma.
 Rajarhat (Community development block) (now shifted to Bidhannagar Subdivision) consists of rural areas with 6  gram panchayats (after Mahishbathan II gram panchayat being shifted to Bidhannagar Municipal Corporation, number of gram panchayats becomes 5) and 1 census town: Raigachhi.

Bangaon subdivision
 1 municipality: Bangaon.
 Bagdah (Community development block) consists of rural areas only with 9 gram panchayats.
 Bangaon (Community development block) consists of rural areas only with 16 gram panchayats.
 Gaighata (Community development block) consists of rural areas with 13 gram panchayats and seven census towns: Chandpara(7,113), Chhekati (4,995), Sonatikiri (6,919), Dhakuria (10,165), Chikanpara (9,594), Shimulpur (20,803) and Bara (5,172).

Basirhat subdivision
 Three municipalities: Basirhat, Baduria and Taki.
 Baduria (Community development block) consists of rural areas only with 14 gram panchayats.
 Basirhat I (Community development block) consists of rural areas only with 7 gram panchayats.
 Basirhat II (Community development block) consists of rural areas with 9 gram panchayats and one census town: Dhanyakuria.
 Haroa (Community development block) consists of rural areas only with 8 gram panchayats.
 Hasnabad (Community development block) consists of rural areas only with 9 gram panchayats.
 Hingalganj (Community development block) consists of rural areas only with 9 gram panchayats.
 Minakhan (Community development block) consists of rural areas only with 8 gram panchayats.
 Sandeshkhali I (Community development block) consists of rural areas only with 8 gram panchayats.
 Sandeshkhali II (Community development block) consists of rural areas only with 8 gram panchayats.
 Swarupnagar (Community development block) consists of rural areas only with 10 gram panchayats.

Bidhannagar subdivision
This subdivision consists of the Bidhannagar Municipal Corporation.
 Rajarhat (Community development block) is also shifted to this subdivision now.

Assembly constituencies
As per order of the Delimitation Commission in respect of the delimitation of constituencies in the West Bengal, the district is divided into 33 assembly constituencies:

 Bagdah, Bangaon Uttar and Dakshin, Gaighata, Swarupnagar, Minakhan and Hingalganj constituencies are reserved for Scheduled Castes (SC) candidates while Sandeshkhali is reserved for Schedule Tribe (ST).
 Bagdaha, Bangaon Uttar and Dakshin, Gaighata, Swarupnagar, and Kalyani and Haringhata (two assembly constituencies from Nadia) assembly constituencies form the Bangaon (Lok Sabha constituency) which is reserved for Schedule Caste (SC) candidate.
 Habra, Ashoknagar, Rajarhat-New Town, Bidhannagar, Madhyagram, Barasat, Deganga assembly constituencies form the Barasat (Lok Sabha constituency).
 Khardaha, Dum Dum, Dum Dum Uttar, Panihati, Kamarhati, Baranagar, Rajarhat Gopalpur assembly constituencies form the Dum Dum (Lok Sabha constituency).
 Amdanga, Bijpur, Naihati, Bhatpara, Jagatdal, Noapara, Barrackpore assembly constituencies form the Barrackpore (Lok Sabha constituency).
 Baduria, Haroa, Minakhan, Sandeshkhali, Basirhat Uttar, Basirhat Dakshin, Hingalganj constituencies are part of the Basirhat (Lok Sabha constituency).

Education

Universities

 Indian Statistical Institute 
 Maulana Abul Kalam Azad University of Technology 
 West Bengal State University 
 JIS University
 Techno India University
 Brainware University 
 Adamas University
 University of Calcutta (Technological Campus) 
 Jadavpur University (Second Campus)
 Aliah University
 Netaji Subhas Open University
 Amity University
 Sister Nivedita University 
 St. Xavier's University, Kolkata

Colleges

 Narula Institute of Technology
Brahmananda Keshab Chandra College
Prasanta Chandra Mahalanobis Mahavidyalaya
 Acharya Prafulla Chandra College
 Basirhat College
 College of Medicine & Sagore Dutta Hospital
 Guru Nanak Institute of Dental Sciences and Research
 Guru Nanak Institute of Technology 
 Bhairab Ganguly College
 Bidhannagar College
 Ramakrishna Mission Vivekananda Centenary College
 Barasat Government College
 Barasat College
 Barrackpore Rastraguru Surendranath College
 Government College of Engineering and Leather Technology 
 Gobardanga Hindu College
 Dinabandhu Mahavidyalay 
 Sree Chaitanya College
 Institute of Engineering and Management
 Taki Government College
Vivekananda College, Madhyamgram
Guru Nanak Institute of Pharmaceutical Science and Technology
Netaji Satabarshiki College, Ashokenagar
 Berachampa shahidullah college

Schools

 Bagdah high School
 Baranagore Ramakrishna Mission Ashrama High School
 Central Modern School
 Sodepur High School
 St. Xavier's Institution (Panihati)
 Adamas International School
 Aditya Academy (Senior Secondary) 
 Auxilium Convent School 
 Barrackpore Government High School
 Berachampa Deulia Uchcha Vidyalaya
 Kendriya Vidyalaya Barrackpore (Army)
 Rahara Ramakrishna Mission Boys' Home High School
Ramakrishna Vivekananda Mission Vidyabhavan Barrackpore
Stratford Day School, Habra
Kalyangarh Bidya Mandir, Ashokenagar
Kalyangarh Balika Bidyamandir, Ashokenagar
 Jadurhati adarsha vidyapith (H.S)

Culture

This district is rich in culture. Many famous places like Dakshineswar Kali Temple, Baranagar Math (first monastery of Ramakrishna Order) are situated in this district. Many places of this district are famous for festivals – Helencha, Habra, Barrackpore, Barasat, Naihati and Madhyamgram are for Kali puja, Bangaon, Baranagar, Basirhat are for Durga puja, Ashoknagar Kalyangarh is for Jagatdhatri puja, Berachampa is for Basanti puja etc.

Transport

Railways
The electrified suburban rail network of the ER is extensive and penetrates far and deep into the neighbouring districts of Kolkata, South 24 Parganas, Nadia, Howrah, Hooghly etc.

The Circular Rail encircles the entire city of Kolkata, and also used to provide an offshoot to connect the Dum Dum Airport, but now it is limited up to Dum Dum Cantonment. Jessore Road and Biman Bandar railway stations are closed for the construction work of Noapara–Dum Dum Airport–Barasat Metro rail (Kolkata Metro Line 4).

Metro rail is also a transport medium of this district's people. Four stations of Kolkata Metro Line 1 are located here, Dum Dum metro station at Dum Dum, Baranagar metro station at Baranagar, Dakshineswar metro station at Dakshineswar and Noapara metro station at Noapara, Baranagar.

Airports

The Netaji Subhash Chandra Bose International Airport (IATA code:CCU), which is at Dum Dum (previously known as Dum Dum Airport) in North 24 Parganas, is the only airport serving the city Kolkata. It operates both domestic and international flights. It is a gateway to North-East India, Bangkok, and Bangladesh. The number of people using the airport has consistently increased over the last few years.

Roadways
The road network is fairly well developed. Sparsed across by state-highways, it provides a convenient means of transport.  NH 
12 connects the district with northern and southern region of the state and its sub road NH 112 connect the district headquarter Barasat with the border town Bangaon and Petrapole, the largest land port of India.

Demographics

According to the 2011 census North 24 Parganas district has a population of 10,009,781, roughly equal to the nation of Bolivia or the US state of Michigan. This gave it a ranking of second in India (out of a total of 640) and first in its state. However, in 2014 the Thane district (in Maharashtra), which had been ranked first in India in 2011, was divided into two, thus promoting North 24 Parganas District to first in India. Its population growth rate over the decade 2001–2011 was 12.86%. North Twenty Four Parganas has a sex ratio of 949 females for every 1000 males, and a literacy rate of 84.95%. Scheduled Castes and Scheduled Tribes make up 21.67% and 2.64% of the population respectively.

 Population Density: 2959 per square km
 Sex ratio: 982 females per 1000 males
 Growth Rate (1991–2000): 24.64% (approximately 2.5% per annum)
 Literacy rate (excluding 0–6 age group), in percentage: 87.66 (highest in West Bengal).
 Male: 93.14; Female: 81.81

Religion

Hinduism is the main religion in the district, and especially dominates urban areas where they are nearly 90% of the population. Most Muslims are rural, and in the rural areas Hindus and Muslims are in equal proportions. In Bongaon and Sandeshkhali regions, Hindus, mainly descendants of refugees from Bangladesh, dominate the rural population. But in the rest of the district, Muslims dominate the rural population. Muslims are in majority in Amdanga (58.48%), Barasat II (73.81%), Deganga (70.92%), Baduria (65.48%), Basirhat I (68.54%), Basirhat II (70.10%), Harora (61.12%), Minakhan (51.60%) and Hasnabad (56.51%) blocks. Muslims are significant minorities in Swarupnagar (47.58%), Habra II (48.76%), Barasat I (44.08%) and Rajarhat (39.89%) CD blocks.

Languages

According to the 2011 census, 88.91% of the population spoke Bengali, 7.69% Hindi and 2.28% Urdu as their first language.

Flora and fauna

Health facilities
 District Hospitals: 10 with 2500 beds
 Sub Divisional Hospitals: 14 with 1870 beds
 State General Hospitals: 18 with 1870 beds
 ESI Hospital: 01 with 200 beds
 Rural Hospitals: 07 with 228 beds
 Block Primary Health Centers: 15

Notable people

 Abhishek Chatterjee, actor
 Jeet Ganguly, musician
 Sanghamitra Bandyopadhyay, Director Indian Statistical Institute
 Shiboprosad Mukherjee, film director
 Ujjwal Maulik, Computer Scientist
 Dola Banerjee, athlete
 Rahul Banerjee, athlete
 Bankim Chandra Chatterjee, writer, novelist
 Manik Bandopadhay, writer, novelist
 Rani Rashmoni, philanthropist
 Titumir, freedom fighter
 Lokenath Brahmachari, mystic
 Bibhutibhushan Bandyopadhyay, writer, novelist
 Ramprasad Sen, poet
 Shyamal Mitra, musician
 Muhammad Shahidullah, educationist, writer, philologist and linguist
 Arunoday Mondal, physician
 Pramatha Nath Bose, Geologist and Paleontologist
 Prabhavathi Devi Saraswathi, Bengali writer and novelist.
 Ishwar Chandra Gupta, Bengali poet and writer
 Rakhaldas Bandyopadhyay, archeologist
 Dinabandhu Mitra, Bengali novelist
 Tanmoy Bhattacharya, politician

Citations

External links

 
 Map of North 24 Parganas
 Another map of North 24 Parganas
 Census 2001 data

 
Districts of West Bengal
Minority Concentrated Districts in India
1986 establishments in West Bengal